Chewed Up is the third concert film and stand-up comedy album by American comedian and director Louis C.K. It was filmed and recorded on March 1, 2008 at the Berklee Performance Center in Boston. Released on CD and DVD by Image Entertainment on December 16, 2008, the special is dedicated to George Carlin, who had coincidentally filmed his final one-hour special on the same night of March 1, 2008 and soon died of heart failure on June 22, 2008. C.K. re-released the DVD, video and audio album for download and streaming on his website in April 2020.

Track listing

Charts

References

External links
 on Louis C.K. official website

2008 live albums
2008 video albums
2000s comedy albums
2000s in comedy
2000s spoken word albums
Image Entertainment live albums
Image Entertainment video albums
Louis C.K. albums
Stand-up comedy concert films